Kurreville is an unincorporated community in Cape Girardeau County, in the U.S. state of Missouri.

History
A post office called Kurreville was established in 1877, and remained in operation until 1913. Fred Kurre, an early postmaster, gave the community his name.

References

Unincorporated communities in Cape Girardeau County, Missouri
Unincorporated communities in Missouri